Trade date is the date on which a security trade occurs. A trade done very early or very late falls on the previous or following trade date.

This occurs because in the international market a trade conducted in (e.g.)

In London and the USA, the settlement period from trade date is 2 days.

See also
Settlement date
Spot date
Value date

References

Securities (finance)
Bond valuation
Swaps (finance)
Settlement (finance)